Michael MacKenzie (born 18 September 1974) is a New Zealand former cricketer. He played two first-class matches for Otago in 1992/93. After his career with Otago, MacKenzie became a player-coach for Taieri Cricket Club in Mosgiel. He played in more than 200 matches for the team, scoring 4,000 runs and taking 250 wickets.

See also
 List of Otago representative cricketers

References

External links
 

1974 births
Living people
New Zealand cricketers
Otago cricketers
People from Ranfurly, New Zealand